The 1976–77 season saw Rochdale compete in their 3rd consecutive season in the Football League Fourth Division

Statistics
																				
																				

|}

Final League Table

Competitions

Football League Fourth Division

F.A. Cup

League Cup

References

Rochdale A.F.C. seasons
Rochdale